The Gulf of Guacanayabo is a bay along the southern coast of Cuba, bordered by Granma and Las Tunas provinces.

Overview
The largest port on the bay is Manzanillo, and the gulf is bordered to the north-west by the Jardines de la Reina archipelago. Cuba's longest river, the Cauto River, empties in the Gulf of Guacanayabo.

It is also where, in 2005, Hurricane Dennis had its peak effect.

References

Guacanayabo
Geography of Granma Province
Geography of Las Tunas Province